The 2021–22 season was the 6th season in the existence of Real Madrid Femenino and the club's 2nd season after being officially rebranded as part of Real Madrid. In addition to the domestic league, they participated in the Copa de la Reina. By virtue of their performances the previous season, the club also competed in the UEFA Women's Champions League and the Supercopa de España for the very first time.

David Aznar returned for his fourth campaign as a coach but was sacked and replaced by Alberto Toril after the club's draw with Alavés on match day eleven.

Competitions

Overall record

Primera División

League table

UEFA Champions League

Second Qualifying Round

The second round draw was held on 22 August 2021.

Real Madrid won 2–1 on aggregate.

Group stage

The group stage draw was held on 13 September 2021.

References

External links

Real Madrid Femenino seasons
2021–22 in Spanish women's football
Spanish football clubs 2021–22 season